Terrell Branch is a  long 1st order tributary to the Hyco River in Halifax County, Virginia.

Course
Terrell Branch rises about 1.5 miles south of Omega, Virginia, and then flows southeast to join the Hyco River about 2.5 miles south of Omega.

Watershed
Terrell Branch drains  of area, receives about 45.7 in/year of precipitation, has a wetness index of 365.53, and is about 89% forested.

See also
List of rivers of Virginia

References

Rivers of Virginia
Rivers of Halifax County, Virginia
Tributaries of the Roanoke River